Honar Abdi (born 30 November 1994) is an Iranian-Finnish footballer of Kurdish origin who plays for JJK.

Career

Kokkolan PV
On 2 January 2019, Abdi signed with Kokkolan PV.

Return to JJV
On 25 March 2022, Abdi returned to JJK for the 2022 season.

Career statistics

References

1994 births
Living people
Finnish footballers
Iranian footballers
Finnish people of Iranian descent
Finnish people of Kurdish descent
Kurdish sportspeople
JJK Jyväskylä players
Kokkolan Palloveikot players
Vaasan Palloseura players
Veikkausliiga players
Ykkönen players
Sportspeople of Iranian descent
Association football fullbacks
Sportspeople from Jyväskylä